This is a list of national Italian TV services available on digital terrestrial, satellite, cable systems in Italy.  Some channels have a "timeshift" service, i.e. the same programming (and usually advertisements as well) broadcast one or two hours later to give viewers another chance to catch a favourite programme. On free satellite, as well as on Sky Italia, foreign channels are also available, such as Euronews, CNN International, MTV Dance, MTV Rocks, etc. For Italian-speaking channels not based in Italy, or not having studios in Italy, please see the link above this paragraph.

National networks

See also 
 Television in Italy
 Media of Italy
 List of newspapers in Italy
 List of magazines published in Italy
 List of radio stations in Italy
 
 Censorship in Italy
 Telecommunications in Italy
 Internet in Italy

References

Italy

Channels